Sammy Hughes was a footballer who played in the Irish League with Glentoran in the 1950s. He signed from Larne in September 1949, He won two Irish League championships (1950/51 and 1952/53), one Irish Cup (1950/51), one Gold Cup, three City Cups and two Ulster Cups. He was capped eight times by the Irish League and scored five goals. He was the Ulster Footballer of the Year for the 1952/53 season. He later played for Larne and Carrick Rangers, winning the B Division title with the latter in 1961/62.

Hughes was a top scorer in the Irish League in the 1949–50, 1950–51 and 1952–1953 seasons.

He died on 28 April 2011, aged 85.

See also 
 List of men's footballers with 500 or more goals

References

Sources
Northern Ireland's Footballing Greats

Association footballers from Northern Ireland
NIFL Premiership players
Ulster Footballers of the Year
Glentoran F.C. players
Larne F.C. players
Carrick Rangers F.C. players
Sportspeople from Ballymena
Year of birth missing
2011 deaths
Association football forwards